The Handball events at the 1998 Asian Games were held in Bangkok, Thailand between December 7 and December 16, 1998. South Korea dominated the competition by winning both gold medals.

Schedule

Medalists

Medal table

Draw

Group A

Group B

Final standing

Men

Women

References
Results – Men
Results – Women
Japan Handball Federation

External links
 Asian Handball Federation

 
1998 Asian Games events
1998
Asian Games
1998 Asian Games